Jánský (less commonly spelled Janský) is a Czech-language surname. Notable people with the surname include:

Peter Jánský (born 1985), Czech hockey player
Jan Janský (1873–1921), Czech serologist, neurologist and psychiatrist, credited with the first classification of blood into the 4 types
Markéta Jánská (born 1981), Czech model
Karl Guthe Jansky (1905–1950), American physicist, radio engineer and discoverer of radio waves emanating from the Milky Way

See also
 Jansky (disambiguation)

West Slavic-language surnames
Czech-language surnames